Kowarzān or Qabarzān is a village in Herat Province, in northwestern Afghanistan.

See also
Herat Province

References

Populated places in Herat Province